The 2006–07 George Mason Patriots men's basketball team began their 41st season of collegiate play on November 11, 2006 at Cleveland State.  This season followed their historic 2005–06 season where they advanced to the Final Four of the 2006 NCAA Men's Division I Basketball Tournament.  However, the 2006–07 team was much less successful; they finishing with an 18-15 record and were not invited to any post-season tournaments.

Season notes
 After playing in the first 2 games, Sammy Hernandez requested a transfer from the team.  He enrolled at Florida Atlantic University.

Awards

Second Team All-CAA
 Will Thomas

Third Team All-CAA
 Folarin Campbell

CAA All-Defensive Team
 Will Thomas

CAA Player of the Week
 Will Thomas – Nov. 13
 Jordan Carter – Jan. 15

CAA Rookie of the Week
 Louis Birdsong – Dec. 26

Roster

Stats

Game log

|-
!colspan=12 style=| Non-conference regular season

|-
!colspan=12 style=|<span style=>CAA regular season

|-
!colspan=12 style=|CAA tournament

Recruiting
The following is a list of players signed for the 2007–08 season:

References

George Mason
George Mason Patriots men's basketball seasons